Parathectis farinata is a moth of the family Gelechiidae. It was described by Edward Meyrick in 1913. It is found in South Africa.

The wingspan is 12–13 mm. The forewings are pale whitish ochreous, irregularly irrorated (sprinkled) with dark fuscous and with a patch of dark fuscous suffusion on the basal portion of the costa. The stigmata are suffused with dark fuscous, the plical obliquely before the first discal. The hindwings are pale whitish ochreous.

References

Endemic moths of South Africa
Moths described in 1913
Gelechiini